Pembroke St Mary North is the name of an electoral ward in the town of Pembroke, Pembrokeshire, Wales. It covers the area of the town north of the Pembroke River and the Mill Pond.

The ward elects a county councillor to Pembrokeshire County Council and four town councillors to Pembroke Town Council.

According to the 2011 UK Census the population of the ward was 2,060.

In July 2018 the sitting county councillor, David 'Dai' Boswell, was convicted and sentenced to 18 years in prison for rape and indecent assault. He resigned from his roles as county and town councillor. He had earlier resigned as mayor of Pembroke. A by-election was planned for 13 September 2018, with eight candidates putting themselves forward for the county council seat.

County elections
As a result of the resignation of Dai Bowsell, a by-election for the Pembroke St Mary North was held on 13 September 2018. It was won from the Welsh Conservative by independent candidate, Jon Harvey, who had finished second to Boswell in 2017 by six votes.

At the May 2017 county election Pembroke St Mary North result was won from the Independents by Welsh Conservative candidate, Dai Boswell. The Conservatives also won seats from the Independent councillors in the neighbouring wards of Pembroke St Mary South and Pembroke St Michael.

At the May 2012 county election Pembroke St Mary North result was retained by Independent councillor Arwyn Williams. Councillor Williams had been county councillor for nine years and a community councillor for thirty years. Following the election, Williams became Chairman of the county council.

At the May 2008 county election Pembroke St Mary North result was retained by Independent councillor Arwyn Williams.

At the June 2004 county election Pembroke St Mary North was won by Independent councillor Arwyn Williams.

* = sitting councillor prior to the election

See also
 List of electoral wards in Pembrokeshire

References

Pembrokeshire electoral wards
Pembroke, Pembrokeshire